The Trial is a 1948 Austrian drama film directed by G. W. Pabst. At the 9th Venice International Film Festival, Pabst won the Award for Best Director; Ernst Deutsch won the award for Best Actor and the Volpi Cup. The story is based on the events of the Tiszaeszlár affair.

Cast
 Ewald Balser as Dr. Eötvös
 Marianne Schönauer as Dr. Eötvös' fiancée
 Ernst Deutsch as Scharf, temple servant
 Rega Hafenbrödl as his wife
 Albert Truby as Moritz, his son
 Heinz Moog as Baron Onody
 Maria Eis as Widow Solymosi
 Aglaja Schmid as Esther, her daughter
 Ida Russka as Bäurin Batori, Esther's employer
 Iván Petrovich as Egressy, prosecutor
 Gustav Diessl as Both, prosecutor
 Fritz Hinz-Fabricius as Judge
 Josef Meinrad as Bary, investigating judge

References

External links

1948 films
1948 drama films
1940s historical drama films
1940s German-language films
Austrian historical drama films
Austrian black-and-white films
Films directed by G. W. Pabst
Films about lawyers
Films set in the 1880s
Films about Jews and Judaism
Films about antisemitism